Hammerbach may refer to:

 Hammerbach (Freital), a river of Saxony, Germany
 Hammerbach (Mies), a river of Bavaria, Germany